Le Pensie is an uninhabited locality and former trading post in Northern Manitoba. It is located southeast of Lac Brochet, on the Cochrane River, just north of Cann Lake.

History

The site is named for Adolphe Lapensée, known in English as Adolf La Pensie, who was a Hudson's Bay Company post manager and fur trader, originally from Plantagenet, Ontario.

After leaving the HBC, Lapensée became an independent fur trader in 1922, operating a post in the Cochrane River area. In 1930, he moved to Brochet with his children so they could attend school, and the post was closed.

The site was first noted on a map by the Department of the Interior in 1925. The name's official status was revoked in 1950, but reinstated in 1979.

References

Hudson's Bay Company trading posts
Unincorporated communities in Northern Region, Manitoba